UFC 41: Onslaught was a mixed martial arts event held by the Ultimate Fighting Championship on February 28, 2003, at the Boardwalk Hall in Atlantic City, New Jersey.  The event was broadcast live on pay-per-view in the United States, and later released on DVD.

History
UFC 41 featured two championship bouts, a Heavyweight Championship Bout between Ricco Rodriguez and Tim Sylvia, and a Lightweight Championship Bout between BJ Penn and Caol Uno. The event also marked the return of Tank Abbott to the UFC. Ken Shamrock served as the color commentator for this card.

Results

Lightweight tournament bracket

1 In UFC 41, B.J. Penn and Caol Uno had a split tie. (48-46, 47-48, 48-48). There was no champion.

See also
 Ultimate Fighting Championship
 List of UFC champions
 List of UFC events
 2003 in UFC

External links
 
 Sherdog event results
 Full Contact Fighter March 2003 News

Ultimate Fighting Championship events
2003 in mixed martial arts
Mixed martial arts in New Jersey
Sports competitions in Atlantic City, New Jersey
2003 in sports in New Jersey